Aldo Mazza is an internationally recognized drummer, percussionist and recording artist. He is also a clinician and educator, and the founder of KoSA Music.

Career 
Aldo Mazza has performed on over 100 CDs and soundtracks, and recorded with such well-known artists as Celine Dion, Jon Bon Jovi and Aldo Nova. He has performed live with artists such as James Brown, Chris De Burgh, Frank Sinatra, Nikki Yanofsky and Oliver Jones.

For over 25 years Aldo Mazza has been a member of the internationally acclaimed percussion quartet, Répercussion. Répercussion has gone around the world twice, recorded five CDs and performed over 2,500 concerts, television and radio appearances including live CBC Radio recordings. Mazza has performed special concerts for dignitaries including Canadian prime ministers and American presidents, and has performed at many prestigious events such as Expo 92 in Spain, Expo 86 in Canada, the Montreal Jazz Festival, the Hong Kong Arts Festival, and as a soloist with many distinguished symphony orchestras such as the Montreal Symphony Orchestra and the National Arts Centre Orchestra of Canada.

Mazza has been covered in magazines and newspapers such as PAS magazine (Percussive Arts Society), Modern Drummer, Percussioni (Italy), Canadian Musician, SOCAN, DRUM!, The Montreal Gazette, Maclean's magazine and Drumclub (Italy). He has also published a number of articles in music trade magazines such as La Scena Musicale, PAS, Vice Versa and SBO.

His sponsors include Pro-Mark, Sabian cymbals, Latin Percussion, and Mike Balter.

Discography 
Aldo Nova Blood on the Bricks
Celine Dion Chante Noel, Incognito
Pagliaro Sous penne d'amour
Buzz band Buzz Band
Répercussion New Kong, Les fantaisies classiques, Repercussion
I Musici Carmen Suite
Kathleen Cette fille là
Montreal Jubilation Choir Jubilation V
Cooper Brothers Cooper Brothers, Cooper Brothers
Phil Wilson conducts the Jazz Band Live and Cooking
Claude Valade Comme tu es grand – chansons chrétiennes
The Plouffe Family (Les Plouffe) Film Soundtrack
André Gagnon St. Laurent
Antonino Mazza The Way I Remember It
Nikki Yanofsky Ella... of Thee I Swing
Serge Laprade De la tête aux pieds
Ronald McDonald Ton sourire et mon sourir
Daniel Janke Daniel Janke
Concept Neuf Concept Neuf
Le Montreal Pop Le Montreal Pop, On est tous musiciens
Hanna Tifert A Voice Calls

Educator 
Mazza is the founder and artistic director of the KoSA Academy and the KoSA International Percussion Workshops and festivals in Canada, Italy, Cuba and the United States. He has been an instructor at  McGill University's Faculty of Music and is currently teaching at the KoSA Academy in Montreal. He also travels world-wide giving music seminars and clinics.

References

External links 
 aldomazza.com
 kosamusic.com

Living people
Canadian percussionists
Year of birth missing (living people)